"Purple Hat" is a song by American duo Sofi Tukker. It was released on September 6, 2019 via Ultra, as a single from their third extended play Dancing on the People.

Background
The duo said in an interview: "We wrote 'Purple Hat' the day after our first Animal Talk party. We started throwing these parties to bring back the wild and inclusive dancing vibe to the nightclub experience. Tuck was literally wearing a purple hat and a cheetah print shirt, people were climbing on top of people, it was over sold out and sweaty, our favorite people were packed in the booth, everyone was loose af and feeling themselves. It was wild. Every Animal Talk party since then has been like that and we wanted to capture that raw feeling in a song. If there was a song that included everything we are about, this would be the one." The music video, directed by Charles Todd, premiered on December 10, 2019.

Charts

Weekly charts

Year-end charts

Certifications

References

2019 singles
2019 songs
Sofi Tukker songs
Song recordings produced by Sofi Tukker
Songs written by Jon Hume
Ultra Music singles